John Christopher Aquilino (born 1961) is an admiral in the United States Navy, serving as the commander of the United States Indo-Pacific Command since April 30, 2021. He previously served as the commander of the United States Pacific Fleet and before that, commander of the United States Fifth Fleet and Combined Maritime Forces.

Naval career

Aquilino graduated from the United States Naval Academy in 1984, earning a Bachelor of Science in Physics. He subsequently entered flight training and earned his wings in August 1986. Aquilino graduated from the Navy Fighter Weapons School (Top Gun), the Joint Forces Staff College and completed Harvard Kennedy School's Executive Education Program in National and International Security.

Aquilino's operational assignments include numerous fighter squadrons flying the F-14 A/B Tomcat and the F-18 C/E/F Hornet. His fleet assignments include the Ghost Riders of Fighter Squadron (VF) 142 and the Black Aces of VF-41. He commanded the Red Rippers of VF-11, Carrier Air Wing 2 and Carrier Strike Group (CSG) 2/George H.W. Bush Strike Group. He has made extended deployments in support of Operations Deny Flight, Deliberate Force, Southern Watch, Noble Eagle, Enduring Freedom and Iraqi Freedom.

Aquilino's shore tour assignments include duties as an adversary instructor pilot flying the A-4, F-5 and F-16N aircraft for the Challengers of VF-43; operations officer of Strike Weapons and Tactics School, Atlantic; flag aide to the vice chief of naval operations; special assistant for weapons and advanced development in the Office of the Legislative Affairs for the Secretary of Defense; director of air wing readiness and training for Commander, Naval Air Forces, Atlantic Fleet; and executive assistant to the commander, United States Fleet Forces Command.

Aquilino's flag assignments include director of strategy and policy (J5), United States Joint Forces Command; deputy director, joint force coordinator (J31), the Joint Staff; commander, CSG-2, director of maritime operations, United States Pacific Fleet (N04); deputy chief of naval operations for operations, plans and strategy (N3/N5); and as commander, United States Naval Forces Central Command, United States 5th Fleet, Combined Maritime Forces.

Aquilino assumed duties as commander, United States Pacific Fleet, on May 17, 2018, the 63rd commander since the fleet's Pearl Harbor headquarters was established in February 1941. He was relieved of the same duties on the morning of April 30, 2021, by Samuel J. Paparo before relieving Philip S. Davidson as commander of Indo-Pacific Command later that day.

Awards and decorations

References

External links

 US Navy Biography: John C. Aquilino

|-

1961 births
Living people
People from Huntington, New York
United States Naval Academy alumni
United States Naval Aviators
Recipients of the Air Medal
Recipients of the Legion of Merit
United States Navy admirals
Recipients of the Defense Superior Service Medal
Recipients of the Navy Distinguished Service Medal
Honorary Officers of the Order of Australia